Okolod, or Kolod, is a language spoken by the Murut people of Borneo.

References

Murutic languages
Endangered Austronesian languages
Languages of Malaysia
Languages of Indonesia